MacGyver is an American action-adventure television series developed by Peter M. Lenkov and starring Lucas Till as the title character. It is a reboot of the ABC series of the same name created by Lee David Zlotoff, which aired from 1985 to 1992. The series premiered on September 23, 2016, on CBS.

In May 2020, CBS renewed the series for a fifth season, which premiered on December 4, 2020.

Series overview

Episodes

Season 1 (2016–17)

In Season 1, all episodes, with the exception of the pilot, are named after a tool on MacGyver's Swiss Army Knife.

Season 2 (2017–18)
In Season 2, all episodes, with the exception of the premiere, are two key parts of an invention that MacGyver creates in the episode.

Season 3 (2018–19)

In Season 3, all episodes, with the exception of the premiere, are three key people/items/events that MacGyver and his friends find or experience in the episode.

Season 4 (2020)

Season 5 (2020–21)

Ratings

Overview

Season 2

 Live +7 ratings were not available, so Live +3 ratings have been used instead.

References

External links 
 
 

Episodes
Lists of American action television series episodes